Dale Gunnar Renlund (born November 13, 1952) is an American religious leader and former cardiologist who serves in the Quorum of the Twelve Apostles of the Church of Jesus Christ of Latter-day Saints (LDS Church). He has been a general authority of the church since 2009. Currently, he is the thirteenth most senior apostle in the church.

Renlund was born in Salt Lake City, Utah, to Mats Åke Renlund and Mariana Andersson. Renlund's parents were from Finland and Sweden and emigrated to the United States so they could marry in an LDS Church temple. Since his parents did not yet know English, Renlund's first language was Swedish. For three years while he was a teenager, Renlund lived with his parents in Sweden where his father was a building missionary for the LDS Church. From 1972 to 1974 Renlund returned to Sweden where he served as a full-time missionary for the LDS Church.

Medical career
He received a bachelor's degree in chemistry and an M.D., both from the University of Utah. He then went on to do a three-year internal medicine residency program and then a three-year cardiology fellowship, both at Johns Hopkins School of Medicine. While working at Johns Hopkins, Renlund served as bishop of an LDS ward. During this time his wife, Ruth, was going to law school.

In 1986, Renlund became a professor at the University of Utah. As a cardiologist, he specialized in heart transplants. From 1991 to 2009, he was the medical director of the Utah Transplantation Affiliated Hospitals Cardiac Transplant Program. In 2000, he also became director of the Heart Failure Prevention and Treatment Program at Intermountain Health Center in Salt Lake City.

LDS Church service
In addition to his time as a bishop, Renlund has served in many positions in the LDS Church, including ward Sunday School president and high councilor. In 1992, Renlund succeeded H. David Burton as president of the Salt Lake University 1st Stake. He served as an area seventy in the church's Utah Salt Lake City Area from 2000 to 2009.

In April 2009, Renlund became a member of the First Quorum of the Seventy, a full-time ecclesiastical position. Later in 2009, Renlund and his wife moved to Johannesburg, South Africa where he served first as a counselor and then from 2011 to 2014 as president of the church's Africa Southeast Area. In this position he oversaw the church in about 20 countries, making trips to many of them, including a total of nearly 40 trips to the Democratic Republic of the Congo.

In October 2015, he was sustained as an apostle and member of the Quorum of the Twelve. As an apostle, he is accepted by the church as a prophet, seer and revelator. He was sustained to the Quorum of the Twelve along with Ronald A. Rasband and Gary E. Stevenson, filling vacancies created by the 2015 deaths of L. Tom Perry, Boyd K. Packer and Richard G. Scott. This was the first time since 1906 that three new apostles were sustained. They are the 98th, 99th and 100th members of the Quorum of the Twelve Apostles in the church's history.

In June 2017, Renlund and his wife spoke at an international forum on religious freedom in Costa Rica and advocated, "Religious beliefs, teachings and practices bring needed medicine to a society that would otherwise be aggressive and sick." In June 2018, Renlund was featured in a series of suicide awareness videos published by the church. The series was aimed at understanding suicide and taking measures to prevent it. Renlund also spoke at a medical conference held in Vatican City in April 2018, describing the church's views on religion improving the health of individuals. In August 2017, Renlund participated in a "Face-to-Face" online event with youth members of the LDS Church in Africa.

In April 2019, Renlund dedicated the Kinshasa Democratic Republic of the Congo Temple. In December 2020, Renlund and his wife tested positive for COVID-19.

Personal life
Renlund married Ruth Lybbert in 1977. She is a daughter of Merlin R. Lybbert, who was a general authority of the LDS Church. The Renlunds are the parents of one daughter. Ruth Renlund was a personal injury trial lawyer and a partner of the law firm of Dewsnup, King & Olsen. Ruth Renlund is an ovarian cancer survivor.

Works

Medical publications

See also
Quentin L. Cook, "Elder Dale G. Renlund: An Obedient Servant", Liahona, July 2016

"Elder Dale G. Renlund," Liahona, May 2009, p. 136
healthgrades report on Renlund

References

External links
General Authorities and General Officers: Elder Dale G. Renlund

1952 births
American cardiologists
American general authorities (LDS Church)
American Mormon missionaries in Sweden
Area seventies (LDS Church)
Johns Hopkins School of Medicine alumni
Living people
Members of the First Quorum of the Seventy (LDS Church)
People from Salt Lake City
American people of Swedish descent
University of Utah School of Medicine alumni
University of Utah faculty
20th-century Mormon missionaries
Physicians from Utah
Latter Day Saints from Utah
Latter Day Saints from Maryland
Apostles (LDS Church)
American expatriates in South Africa